Nathan Davis is the name of:

Nathan Davis (traveller) (1812–1882), British missionary and amateur excavator at Carthage
Nathan Davis (actor) (1917–2008), American actor 
Nathan Davis (saxophonist) (1937–2018), American jazz saxophonist
Nathan Davis (gridiron football) (born 1974), defensive lineman
Nathan Smith Davis (1817–1904), physician instrumental in founding Northwestern University
Nathan Smith Davis Jr. (1858–1920), physician and dean of Northwestern University Medical College
Nathan Davis (basketball) (born 1974), American college basketball coach
Nathan Davis (rugby league) (born 1995), Australian rugby league player

See also
Nate Davis (disambiguation)
Nathaniel Davis (disambiguation)